Tabernaemontana coriacea is a species of plant in the family Apocynaceae. It is found in western Brazil, Peru, and Bolivia.

References

coriacea